Salaakhen may refer to:

 Salaakhen (1975 film), a 1975 Hindi film
 Salaakhen (1998 film), a 1998 Indian Bollywood film